Kobrin, Kobryn, or Cobrin is a surname of Slavic origin. It may refer to:

Kobrin
 Alexander Kobrin (1980-), Russian pianist
 Helena Kobrin (1948-), controversial Scientologist and lawyer
 Leon Kobrin (1873–1946), playwright in Yiddish theater
 Vladimir Kobrin (1930-90), Soviet historian
 Vjatšeslav Kobrin (1958–2016), Russian guitarist

Kobryn
 Cris Kobryn, technologist, software architect and entrepreneur
 Alen Pol Kobryn (1949-), American poet and novelist

Cobrin
 G. M. Cobrin, scientist; See Crohn's disease
 Mel Dobrin and Marilyn Steinberg Cobrin; See Steinberg's Supermarkets